Mary Virginia Curtis Verna (May 9, 1921 – December 4, 2009) was an American operatic soprano, particularly associated with the Italian repertory.

Born in Salem, Massachusetts, she studied at Abbot Academy and Hollins College, and later in Italy with Ettore Verna, whom she married. 

She made her stage debut at the Teatro Lirico in Milan, as Desdemona, in 1949. She sang widely in Italy, as Maria Curtis Verna, and made guest appearances at the Vienna State Opera and the Munich State Opera.

Verna made her American debut at the Academy of Music in Philadelphia with the Philadelphia Civic Grand Opera Company on May 14, 1952 in the title role of Giuseppe Verdi's Aida with Ramón Vinay as Radamès, Claramae Turner as Amneris, and Giuseppe Bamboschek conducting. Later that year she portrayed the same role for he debut at the San Francisco Opera. She made her debut at the New York City Opera, as Donna Anna, in 1954, and at the Metropolitan Opera in 1957, as Leonora in Il Trovatore. Her other roles at the Met  included Aida, Leonora (La forza del destino), Elisabetta (Don Carlo), Santuzza (Cavalleria rusticana), Tosca and Turandot. 

She appeared in Cincinnati and Baltimore, and at the Teatro Colón in Buenos Aires. She became well-known and acclaimed at the Metropolitan in the 1950s and '60s for stepping into roles for indisposed divas often on only a few hours notice.

Verna made few commercial recordings, but she can be heard in three complete operas for Cetra Records; Don Giovanni, Un ballo in maschera, and Aida.

Verna left the Metropolitan Opera in 1966. In 1969, she was offered and accepted the position of Head of the Voice Department at the University of Washington School of Music. She retired from the University of Washington in 1991.

Verna died at her home in Seattle, Washington on December 4, 2009 at the age of 88.

References

Sources
 Operissimo.com

1921 births
2009 deaths
American operatic sopranos
People from Salem, Massachusetts
Hollins University alumni
University of Washington faculty
Singers from Massachusetts
20th-century American women opera singers
American women academics
21st-century American women